Valentia Harbour railway station was the terminus of the Farranfore–Valentia Harbour line originally operated by the Great Southern and Western Railway in Ireland. It was the most westerly railway station in Europe.

History

A station at Valentia Harbour was suggested from as early as 1846, as there were suggestions that the Harbour should be used as a packet station for services to the United States of America.
 
However, it took much longer to come to fruition and the station was finally opened on 12 September 1893.

The station closed on 1 February 1960, the last service train having run on 30 January 1960.

Route

References

Footnotes

Sources
 
 
 

Farranfore–Valentia Harbour line
Disused railway stations in County Kerry
Railway stations opened in 1893
Railway stations closed in 1960